The Tzoonie River is a remote, short river that enters the head of the Narrows Inlet about 36.6 km north of Sechelt, British Columbia.

Course 
The Tzoonie River originates at the outlet of Tzoonie Lake, a remote lake located about 6.3 km west of Mount Jimmy Jimmy.  The river drops steeply from the lake's outlet, with a major waterfall possibly just below the lake.  It flows southwest for about 3.9 km until it enters an unnamed lake.  From the outlet of that lake, the river continues southwest for about 7.4 km to its confluence with one of its 2 named tributaries, Chickwat Creek, where it turns south.  From there, the river flows south for about 5.5 km to its mouth at the head of the Narrows Inlet.

Tributaries 
Tyson Creek: Flows northwest from the Tyson Lakes to meet with the Tzoonie about 0.4 km above the mouth of Chickwat Creek.
Chickwat Creek: Meets the river about 0.4 km below the mouth of Tyson Creek.

See also
List of British Columbia rivers
Sechelt Inlet

References 

Rivers of the Pacific Ranges
New Westminster Land District